

People 
, a Japanese actor

Characters 
Bunta Marui, a character attending Rikkai Daigaku Fuzoku in the series The Prince of Tennis.
 Bunta, known as the chief toad of Mount Myoboku, is one of the giant toads from Myoboku from the anime and manga series, Naruto.

See also 
 Roşia Montană for Bunta, a village in Romania
 The Bunta Trilogy, a Chinese 3D animated film series

Japanese masculine given names